The interleukin 4 (IL4, IL-4) is a cytokine that induces differentiation of naive helper T cells (Th0 cells) to Th2 cells. Upon activation by IL-4, Th2 cells subsequently produce additional IL-4 in a positive feedback loop. IL-4 is produced primarily by mast cells, Th2 cells, eosinophils and basophils. It is closely related and has functions similar to IL-13.

Function 

Interleukin 4 has many biological roles, including the stimulation of activated B cell and T cell proliferation, and the differentiation of B cells into plasma cells. It is a key regulator in humoral and adaptive immunity.   IL-4 induces B cell class switching to IgE, and up-regulates MHC class II production.  IL-4 decreases the production of Th1 cells, macrophages, IFNγ, and dendritic cells IL-12.

Overproduction of IL-4 is associated with allergies.

Inflammation and wound repair 

Tissue macrophages play an important role in chronic inflammation and wound repair. The presence of IL-4 in extravascular tissues promotes alternative activation of macrophages into M2 cells and inhibits classical activation of macrophages into M1 cells. An increase in repair macrophages (M2) is coupled with secretion of IL-10 and TGF-β that result in a diminution of pathological inflammation. Release of arginase, proline, polyaminases and TGF-β by the activated M2 cell is tied with wound repair and fibrosis.

Receptor 

The receptor for interleukin-4 is known as the IL-4Rα. This receptor exists in 3 different complexes throughout the body. Type 1 receptors are composed of the IL-4Rα subunit with a common γ chain and specifically bind IL-4. Type 2 receptors consist of an IL-4Rα subunit bound to a different subunit known as IL-13Rα1. These type 2 receptors have the ability to bind both IL-4 and IL-13, two cytokines with closely related biological functions.

Structure 

IL-4 has a compact, globular fold (similar to other cytokines), stabilised by 3 disulphide bonds. One half of the structure is dominated by a 4 alpha-helix bundle with a left-handed twist. The helices are anti-parallel, with 2 overhand connections, which fall into a 2-stranded anti-parallel beta-sheet.

Evolution 
IL-4 is closely related to IL-13, and both stimulate Type 2 immunity. Genes of this family have also been found in fish, both in bony fish and cartilaginous fish; because at that evolutionary level they can't be distinguished as IL-4 or IL-13, they have been named IL-4/13.

Discovery 
This cytokine was co-discovered by Maureen Howard and William E. Paul as well as by Ellen Vitetta and her research group in 1982.

The nucleotide sequence for human IL-4 was isolated four years later confirming its similarity to a mouse protein called B cell stimulatory factor-1 (BCSF-1).

Animal studies 
IL-4 has been found to mediate a crosstalk between the neural stem cells and neurons that undergo neurodegeneration, and initiate a regeneration cascade through phosphorylation of its intracellular effector STAT6 in an experimental Alzheimer's disease model in adult zebrafish brain.

Clinical significance 

IL-4 has also been shown to drive mitogenesis, dedifferentiation, and metastasis in rhabdomyosarcoma. IL-4, along with other Th2 cytokines, is involved in the airway inflammation observed in the lungs of patients with allergic asthma.

Illnesses associated with IL-4 

IL-4 plays an important role in the development of certain immune disorders, particularly allergies and some autoimmune diseases.

Allergic diseases
Allergic diseases are sets of disorders that are manifested by a disproportionate response of the immune system to the allergen and Th2 responses. These pathologies include, for example, atopic dermatitis, asthma, or systemic anaphylaxis. Interleukin 4 mediates important pro-inflammatory functions in asthma, including induction of isotype rearrangement of IgE, expression of VCAM-1 molecules (vascular cell adhesion molecule 1), promoting eosinophilic transmigration through endothelium, mucus secretion and T helper type 2 (Th2) leading to cytokine release. Asthma is a complex genetic disorder that has been associated with IL-4 gene promoter polymorphism and proteins involved in IL-4 signaling.

Tumors
IL-4 has a significant effect on tumor progression. Increased IL-4 production was found in breast, prostate, lung, renal cells and other types of cancer. Overexpression of IL-4R has been found in many types of cancer. Renal cells and glioblastoma modify – receptors per cell depending on tumor type.

IL-4 can primitively motivate tumor cells and increase their apoptosis resistance by increasing tumor growth.

Nervous system
Brain tissue tumors such as astrocytoma, glioblastoma, meningioma, and medulloblastoma overexpress receptors for various growth factors including epidermal growth factor receptor, FGFR-1 (fibroblast growth factor receptor 1), TfR (transferrin receptor), IL-13R. Most human meningiomas massively expresses IL-4 receptors, indicating its role in cancer progression. They express IL-4Rα and IL13Rα-1-1, but not the surface γc chain, suggesting that most human meningiomas express IL-4 type II.

HIV
IL-4 may also play a role in the infection and development of HIV disease. Auxiliary T cells are a key element of HIV-1 infection. Several signs of immune dysregulation such as polyclonal B cell initialization, previous cell-mediated antigen-induced response and hypergammaglobulinaemia occur in most HIV-1 infected patients and are associated with cytokines synthesized by Th2 cells. Increased IL-4 production by Th2 cells has been demonstrated in people infected with HIV.

See also 
 STAT6

References

Further reading

External links 
 
 Interleukin-4 from Gentaur
 Recombinant Human Interleukin-4 from Cornell University
 Interleukin-4 from Allergy Glossary at Health On the Net Foundation
 

Protein domains
Interleukins